Benoit Lecomte (born 1967) is a French-born long-distance swimmer (now a naturalized American citizen) who swam several sections of the Atlantic Ocean in 1998. Many major media outlets initially wrongly reported that he swam the entire distance across the ocean, but the claim was dismissed and is officially recognized by Guinness World Records since there is certainty about the distance that Lecomte covered swimming.

Atlantic Ocean swim 

From 16 march to 25 September 1998, Lecomte undertook a swim in stages from Hyannis, Massachusetts to Quiberon, Brittany, France, including a one-week stop in the Azores, a Portuguese archipelago.

He was accompanied by a crew of three aboard the sailboat, where he could rest and eat between each swimming period. Lecomte typically spent eight hours swimming each day in sessions of two to four hours.

The stated purpose of the swim was to raise money for cancer research as a tribute to his father.

Controversy 

Since there is no standard definition of "swimming across the Atlantic", there is uncertainty about the distance that Lecomte actually covered swimming in the water rather than riding in a boat with the prevailing currents. According to the Rocky Mountain News, Lecomte would have had to average  to have swum the entire distance, 3 to 4 times as fast as other long-distance swimmers.

Other Atlantic Ocean swim claims 

 Guy Delage – swim from Cape Verde Islands to Barbados in 1994
 Jennifer Figge – swim from Cape Verde Islands to Trinidad in 2009

The Pacific Swim 
Benoit Lecomte began his swim of the Pacific Ocean on Tuesday June 5th 2018. He began in Chōshi Japan in the Kantō region, and hoped to make it to California. He expected the trip to take about six months. Part of the reason for the swim was to raise awareness about sustainability and the impact of excessive human garbage polluting the world's oceans. Lecomte said:

"Before anything else I am a father and as a father the future of my children concerns me because, as we all know, our way of life is not sustainable. I don't want to be passive and pass on to my children the liability we are tagging on to our environment. We can all make a difference once we realize how we can be better stewards of the environment and our own ecological footprint, make appropriate daily changes and inspire others to do the same. This is the first goal of this event and is intended to get people's attention throughout the world and to understand that the solution is in our hands and that we can take action.

The second goal is to encourage and work with the education system in all countries to include classes on sustainability and what our ecological footprints are into their own curriculum, because, as we all know, sustainability starts with education."

Lecomte was accompanied by a crew and performed a "staged swim" (resuming the swim in the exact location in which he left the water) using a GPS tracking device, enabling him to accurately track the number of miles he completed thus enabling him to reach a new world record in open water swimming. Lecomte planned to average about  a day, swimming eight hours with the help of the current.

After about 1,700 miles of swimming, the main sail of Lecomte's assistance boat had been repeatedly torn by heavy winds. The team repaired the tears over and over, breaking nine pencil-sized needles during the trip, but Lecomte ultimately decided to cancel the swim to keep his crew safe.

References

External links
"https://web.archive.org/web/20120322201429/http://thescoopblog.dallasnews.com/archives/2012/03/grand-prairie-man-plans-to-swi.html"
"http://auburnjournal.com/detail/203142.html"
Report on Ben Lecomte at the US French embassy website.
Swimming Around The World.  Retrieved 1 Aug 2004.

French male long-distance swimmers
History of the Atlantic Ocean
1967 births
Naturalized citizens of the United States
Living people
Place of birth missing (living people)
University of Texas at San Antonio alumni